Bob Norberg was a recording engineer for Capitol Records, known for his work mixing or re-mastering recordings by many popular and classical artists, including Les Paul, Nat King Cole, Frank Sinatra, the Beach Boys, Itzhak Perlman, and many others.

References

American audio engineers
Living people
Year of birth missing (living people)